Yuknoom Tiʼ Chan was a king of Maya Kaan kingdom. He ruled in 619.

He is known only from a single inscription where he is said to have supervised Kʼan II of Caracol in some no-longer-legible event in 619.

References

Kings of Calakmul
7th century in the Maya civilization
7th-century monarchs in North America